"The Man" is a song by American rock band the Killers from their fifth studio album, Wonderful Wonderful (2017). It was released on June 14, 2017, as the lead single from the album.

Background and artwork
Drummer Ronnie Vannucci Jr. stated that the song's lyrics were "largely about how when we were younger we felt invincible. What it meant to be a 'man' in your 20's. Sort of your chest out, the breadwinner, nothing could stop you, invincible sort of thing. It's sort of tongue-and-cheeking that, how that is not really the point of being a man at all. It's actually more about compassion and empathy." According to the band's vocalist Brandon Flowers, the song is a response to the more delicate songs of the album, including "Rut" and "Some Kind of Love": "Those songs came and it was like, 'These are more tender or contemplative than we've ever been, how did we get to this point?' Reflecting on that was where 'The Man' came from."

The artwork for the single features Flowers's youngest son Henry and was shot by Anton Corbijn.

Composition
"The Man" is a new wave, pop rock, disco-rock, and glam rock song written by the Killers and Jacknife Lee, the latter of whom also produced it. The track contains elements of the 1975 Kool & the Gang song "Spirit of the Boogie". Lyrically, the song is a self-reflection of Brandon Flowers' cockier early years and described by himself as a way of reconciling that wide-eyed character with the man he is now.

Release and promotion
Starting on May 6, 2017, the band tweeted a series of photographs and short videos to tease their then-untitled fifth studio album. Among the tweets was a photograph of Flowers wearing a silver jacket with gold lettering spelling out "The Man". On June 14, 2017, "The Man" was released as the lead single from Wonderful Wonderful. BBC Radio 1's Annie Mac debuted the track as "Annie Mac's Hottest Record in the World".

On July 31, 2017, the band performed "The Man" on Jimmy Kimmel Live!. On August 20, 2017, Showtime released a promotional video featuring the band performing "The Man" to promote Floyd Mayweather Jr. vs. Conor McGregor.

Critical reception
The single received mostly positive reviews from music critics. Ryan Dombal from Pitchfork described "The Man" as an "over shiny, strutting funk descended from James Brown's '80s anthem 'Living in America'", saying Flowers brags about himself to the point of ridiculousness. He added: "The song is called "The Man", but its ideas of manliness are nothing but boyish. As American masculinity continues to evolve, and threatens to fall back on ugly old norms, The Killers try to have it both ways here, poking fun at dick-swinging supremacy while serving up something that could reasonably soundtrack a rough-and-dusted pickup truck commercial." Writing for DIY magazine, Will Richards praised Flowers' confidence on the song and called it "huge, bombastic and fearless". Robin Murray of Clash called the song "daft, delirious and completely addictive".

Commercial performance
The song debuted on Billboards Alternative Songs chart at number 26 the week after its release. On the same week, it ranked as Alternative Radio's most added song. The track subsequently became The Killers' ninth song to reach the top 10 of the Alternative Songs chart, before entering the top five. "The Man" subsequently reached number one on Billboards Adult Alternative Songs chart, their first song to do so in over 10 years since "Read My Mind". The song also reached number one on Mediabase's alternative airplay chart.

Music video
The accompanying music video for the single was directed by Tim Mattia and released on June 28, 2017. The video, filmed in Las Vegas, features Flowers portraying five characters—a gambler, a lounge singer, a playboy, a motocross racer, and a karaoke singer—that are connected by their obsession with ego and fame. By the end of the video, all of Flowers' characters begin to fall apart as their success fades: the gambler loses his car; the curtains close on the lounge singer; the girls all ditch the playboy; the old tapes show the rider's career-ending accident; and the karaoke singer gets beaten up for flirting with a customer's wife. It includes a cameo by former Mayor of Las Vegas and current First Gentleman of Las Vegas Oscar Goodman.

Awards

Accolades

Usage in media
The song was featured in a trailer for Vice, a 2018 biopic of former Vice President of the United States Dick Cheney.

The Jacques Lu Cont remix was featured in the 2018 video game Forza Horizon 4.

The song is featured in the 2018 video game EA Sports UFC 3.

The song plays at the end of DC's Stargirl season 1, episode 2 ("S.T.R.I.P.E.").

The song was featured in the 2018 season of Hard Knocks. In a segment where a then free agent Dez Bryant tours the Cleveland Browns facility.

Track listing
Digital download
"The Man" – 4:08

Credits and personnel
Credits adapted from the liner notes of Wonderful Wonderful.

Recording
 Recorded at 11th Street Records (Las Vegas, Nevada), The Garage (Topanga, California), Battle Born Studios (Las Vegas, Nevada), and The Phantasy Sound (London)
 Mixed at Strongroom (London)
 Mastered at Metropolis (London) and The Mastering Palace (New York City)

Personnel
The Killers
 Brandon Flowers – vocals, keys
 Dave Keuning – guitar
 Mark Stoermer – bass
 Ronnie Vannucci Jr. – drums

Additional personnel

 Jacknife Lee – production, engineering, guitar, keys, programming
 Matt Bishop – engineering
 Robert Root – engineering
 Malcolm Harrison – engineering assistance
 Erol Alkan – additional production, drum programming, percussion, synth
 Jimmy Robertson – production assistance
 Becca Marie – additional vocals
 Las Vegas Mass Choir – additional vocals
 Nina Fechner – additional vocals
 Justin Diaz – additional vocals
 Dan Grech-Marguerat – mixing, additional programming
 Joel Davies – mixing assistance
 Charles Haydon Hicks – mixing assistance
 John Davis – mastering
 Dave Kutch – mastering

Charts

Weekly charts

Year-end charts

Certifications

Release history

Cover versions
A cover by English jazz-pop singer Jamie Cullum was released as the lead single from the soundtrack to the 2018 heist film King of Thieves.

References

2017 singles
2017 songs
American pop rock songs
Dance-rock songs
Glam rock songs
Island Records singles
The Killers songs
Song recordings produced by Jacknife Lee
Songs written by Brandon Flowers
Songs written by Claydes Charles Smith
Songs written by Dave Keuning
Songs written by Jacknife Lee
Songs written by Mark Stoermer
Songs written by Robert "Kool" Bell
Songs written by Ronald Bell (musician)
Songs written by Ronnie Vannucci Jr.